Hiroyuki Miyazawa (born 12 October 1991) is a Japanese cross-country skier who participated in the 2014 Winter Olympics.

He competed at the 2022 Winter Olympics.

References

1991 births
Living people
Olympic cross-country skiers of Japan
Japanese male cross-country skiers
Tour de Ski skiers
Cross-country skiers at the 2014 Winter Olympics
Cross-country skiers at the 2022 Winter Olympics